Eugène Vincent Vidal (1850–1908) was a French painter of portraits and genre scenes.

Life 
Eugène Vincent Vidal was born in Paris in 1850. He was a pupil of Jean-Léon Gérôme, and exhibited at the Paris Salon for the first time in 1873. He used thick layers of paint to depict Algerian street scenes in the Orientalist style. He died in Cagnes-sur-Mer in 1908.

Gallery

References

Sources 

 Bénézit, Emmanuel (1924). «Vidal (Eugène)». In Dictionnaire critique et documentaire des peintres, sculpteurs, dessinateurs & graveurs de tous les temps et de tous les pays. Vol. 3. Paris: Ernest Gründ. p. 995.
 Beyer, Andreas; Savoy, Bénédicte; Tegethoff, Wolf, eds. (2021). "Vidal, Eugene Vincent". Allgemeines Künstlerlexikon - International Artist Database - Online. Berlin, New York: K. G. Saur. Retrieved 7 October 2022 – via De Gruyter.
 "Vidal, Eugène Vincent". Benezit Dictionary of Artists. 2011. Oxford University Press. Retrieved 7 October 2022 – via Oxford Art Online.
 «Archives reconstituées de Paris, acte de naissance, année 1844». p. 29/51.
 «Archives de Paris 9e, acte de mariage no 65, année 1880». p. 14/31.
 «Archives de Cagnes-sur-Mer, acte de décès no 83, année 1907». p. 349/440.
 «Nécrologie». La Chronique des arts et de la curiosité, no. 2. 11 January 1908. p. 15.

1850 births
1908 deaths
19th-century French painters
20th-century French painters
Orientalist painters